Re Produce Marketing Consortium Ltd (No 2) [1989] 5 BCC 569 was the first UK company law or UK insolvency law case under the wrongful trading provision of s 214 Insolvency Act 1986.

Facts
Eric Peter David and Ronald William Murphy ran Produce Marketing Consortium Ltd, importing lemons, grapefruit and oranges from Cyprus (previously, more Spain). It got shipped to Portsmouth. They were the only employees by the end (except David’s wife who did clerical work for £70 per month). PMC was incorporated in 1964 as an amalgamation of three smaller businesses. David was director from the start, and owned half the shares. As other directors left and died, Murphy became the other director in 1974. He had no accountancy qualifications, but was an experienced bookkeeper. The company earned profit through a 3.5% commission on the gross sale price of the fruit which was imported through its agency. But the business was dropping because they lost business of a large Spanish exporter. They made losses of £14K, £25K and £21K in 1981, 1982 and 1983, and a profit of £43 in 1984, by which time there was a bank overdraft of £91K. The report for that year was that,

“At the balance sheet date, the company was insolvent but the directors are confident that if the company continues to trade, it will be able to meet its liabilities.”

The auditor said the company’s continuation depended on the bank’s continued facilities. Banco Exterior SA took a secured debenture on 18 October 1983 on all property and assets, present and future, including good will, book debts and uncalled capital (but fixed assets were only £5000). They also took a personal guarantee from David for £30K. The draft accounts for 1984-6 were produced by auditors six months late in January 1987. They showed a £55K loss and £29K loss, with liabilities over assets reaching £175K. Auditors warned of insolvent trading, if the bank did not give more credit. The bank did oblige in March, but less than before. The overdraft decreased, but debt to its most important Cypriot shipper increased to £175K. The company was put in creditors’ voluntary liquidation on 2 October 1987, with debts of £317,694, half owed to one Cypriot shipping firm, as a trade creditor that brought them fruit. In 1988 the liquidator asked David and Murphy why there was trading while insolvent. David replied that they knew liquidation was inevitable in February with the accounts, and trading was continued because there was perishable fruit in cold store. The liquidator sought them to contribute £107,946 each, plus costs the court saw fit. The liquidator argued that the right measure to contribute was the reduction in net assets caused by the wrongful trading.

Miss Mary Arden QC was acting for the liquidator.

Judgment

Knox J held that £75K should be contributed by both (not each). David should pay the first £50K and above that they would be jointly liable. They should have concluded in July 1986 there was no reasonable prospect of avoiding this, and though they did not have the accounts till January 1987 they had an intimate knowledge of the business and must have known turnover was well down on previous years. s 214(4) was applied, so it did not matter that they may not have actually known about the accounts. They ought to have known the results for the financial year 1985-6. The two had not taken steps they should have under s 214(3). After February 1987, trading was not limited to realising the fruit in cold store. Overall, s 214 was compensatory, not penal, and the right amount to contribute was the amount caused to be depleted by the directors’ conduct. The key parts of Knox J's decision were as follows.

See also

UK insolvency law
Wrongful trading
Re Brian D Pierson (Contractors) Ltd [2001] 1 BCLC 275, [1999] BCC 26

Notes

References

United Kingdom insolvency case law
High Court of Justice cases
1989 in case law
1989 in British law